At least 12 special routes of U.S. Route 14 have existed.

Existing

Wyoming alternate route

U.S. Highway 14 Alternate is an alternate route for U.S. Highway 14 between Cody and Burgess Junction known as the Medicine Wheel Passage.

Sheridan business route

U.S. Highway 14 Business is a route completely concurrent with I-90 Business, providing access to downtown Sheridan, Wyoming in an area where US 14 was routed to follow I-90.

South Dakota alternate route

U.S. Highway 14A is an alternate route for U.S. Highway 14 between Spearfish and Sturgis located mostly south of the I-90/US 14 overlap. The route begins at the I-90/US 14/US 85 overlap at Exit 14 which serves 27th Street. It briefly runs south and then turns west along East Colorado Boulevard (BL 90), which is used as a frontage road along the south side of I-90. In between the Alt. US 14 and I-90 is the Spearfish Recreational Trail. BL 90/US 14A moves away from I-90 just before the intersection with Sandstone Hills Drive. At Spearfish Canyon Highway, US 14A leaves the overlap with BL 90 and turns south. A spur of the Spearfish Recreational Trail leave US 14A at Winterville Road, and in the vicinity of the southern trailhead of the Spearfish Path, the route begins to wind around Spearfish Creek and Spearfish Canyon running through the North Hills of the Black Hills National Forest, which includes scenic areas for both cars and hikers, and unincorporated communities and ghost towns such as Maurice, Victoria, and Elmore. 

In Cheyenne Crossing, the road turns left and begins the first of two overlaps with US 85. The two routes form a concurrency from there to Lead, then are separated where it continues north also overlapping U.S. Truck Route 85, only to turn east as the routes run through Center City and Backtail. The route meets US 85 again in Deadwood. The routes run together through Deadwood before splitting again, and US 14A turns east along Boulder Canyon Highway. US Highway 14A ends in Sturgis at the I-90/US 14 interchange at Exit 30, but the road continues as another Business Loop of I-90 with an overlap of SD 34 and 79.

Pierre truck route

U.S. Highway 14 Truck is a truck route of US 14. Trucks and overheight vehicles use the truck route to avoid colliding with a low-clearance railroad overpass. The truck route begins at Pierre Street and travels eastward along Sioux Avenue. At , the truck route turns northeastward and crosses the same railroad, but at a railroad crossing. The route then runs along Wells Avenue for over  before turning north along Garfield Avenue. It then continues northward for around  before meeting US 14/US 83.

Huron business loop

U.S. Highway 14 Business (US 14 Bus.) is am unmarked business loop of US 14 in Huron. The business route begins at the intersection with SD Truck Route 37 running south in an overlap to Old Highway 14, then turns left onto Old Highway 14 running in close proximity of the south side of the RCPE Pierre Subdivision. At Lincoln Avenue, Old Highway 14 becomes Market Street Southwest and passes by the northern edge of the South Dakota State Fairgrounds. East of Livestock Avenue, the road curves around a railroad junction with a former Great Northern Railway line (now the Yale Spur Subdivision), but still rejoins the same trajectory of the railroad line, albeit further away. Market Street Southwest becomes Market Street Southeast at the intersection with South Dakota Highway 37. Once it passes by the Old C&NW Huron Roundhouse, the Pierre Subdivision becomes the Huron Subdivision.

Market Street Southeast ends at Franklin Avenue Southeast and the route runs for one block south until the intersection with Third Street Southeast then turns east once again. East of Lawnbridge Avenue, the road enters Riverside Park where it crosses a bridge over the  James River. Immediately after the bridge, the route leaves Third Street and turns north at Riverside Avenue, passing under the Huron Subdivision which uses the former Chicago and Northwestern Railway bridge over the James River. Riverside Avenue runs along the east side of the river, but then begins to pull away from it before the road ends at a flyover interchange with eastbound US 14 and westbound US 14.

Brookings bypass route

U.S. Route 14 Bypass is a bypass route of US 14 along the northern edge of Brookings, South Dakota. The bypass route begins at a partial interchange with US 14 and travels eastward in a somewhat straight line. After meeting and passing I-29, the route begins to curve south before ending at US 14.

Dodge Center business loop

U.S. Highway 14 Business (US 14 Bus.) is a business loop of US 14 in Dodge Center. The business route begins at a roundabout diamond interchange and travels northeast alongside MN 56. The business route runs concurrently with County Road 34 along the way eastward. In Dodge Center, the road becomes Highway Street. At the town limit east of Dodge Center, the route turns south and joins back with US 14.

Former

Sheridan business loop

Rapid City business loop

Madison business loop

Janesville business loop

Business U.S. Highway 14 (Bus. US 14) in Janesville, Wisconsin, was a locally posted route along what used to be mainline US 14 until 1952. Currently, only the portion from I-39/I-90, east toward US 14 east of Janesville, runs along State Trunk Highway 11 (WIS 11). Northwest of Janesville, Bus. US 14 runs along County Trunk Highway E (CTH-E)/Washington Street.

Signage for Bus. US 14 appears to be missing at some locations within the city. It is unknown if the route markers are currently being maintained by the city or if they are no longer being replaced as they reach the end of their lifespans. However, in 2001, the Wisconsin Department of Transportation (WisDOT) removed Bus. US 14 west of the Rock River from official road maps, and, in 2006, the remaining section east of the river was removed.

While City US 14 became Bus. US 14 in 1963, several City US 14 route marker assemblies remain in Janesville. Also, the first reassurance marker assembly along CTH-E also includes a sign for Bus. US 14.

Woodstock business loop

U.S. Route 14 Business was a business route of US 14. Prior to 1962, US 14 traveled through the city of Woodstock. In 1962, US 14 moved south to travel on a newly-built bypass. US 14 Bus. was then signed in 1963, which traveled along the former alignment in Woodstock. This designation lasted until 1971 when the business route was removed.

See also
 
 
 
 List of special routes of the United States Numbered Highway System

References

 
14
14
14
14
14
14